After is a non-fiction book, written by Canadian writer Francis Chalifour, first published in October 2005 by Tundra Books. In the book, the author narrates his pain and confusion as he grieved his father's death by suicide. Judith Miller, an award judge for the Edna Staebler Award called After, "deeply moving" saying, "We enjoyed the lyricism of his language and his strong sense of character."

Awards and honours
After received the 2006 "Edna Staebler Award for Creative Non-Fiction". The book was also nominated for a Governor General's Literary Award in 2005.

See also
List of Edna Staebler Award recipients

References

External links
Tundra Books, Francis Chalifour, Artist Spotlight, Retrieved 11/27/2012

Canadian non-fiction books
2005 non-fiction books